Fellaster is a genus of echinoderms belonging to the family Clypeasteridae.

The species of this genus are found in Australia and New Zealand.

Species:

Fellaster incisa 
Fellaster zelandiae

References

Clypeasteridae
Echinoidea genera